Top Boy is a British television crime drama series, created and written by Ronan Bennett. The series is set in the fictional Summerhouse estate in the London Borough of Hackney and focuses on two drug dealers Dushane (Ashley Walters) and Sully (Kane Robinson) along with others involved with drug-dealing and gang violence in London.

There are 26 episodes across four series. The first two series was with 4 episodes each broadcast on Channel 4, with the first series airing over four consecutive nights from 31 October to 3 November 2011 and the second series airing from 20 August to 10 September 2013. Although storylines for a third series were proposed, the series was dropped by Channel 4 in 2014.

Following interest from Canadian rapper Drake, it was announced in 2017 that Netflix would revive the series, with both Ashley Walters and Kane Robinson, as well as the original crew, reprising their roles and Drake and his team executively producing. The third and fourth series premiered on Netflix in September 2019 and March 2022, respectively and were presented as the first and second season of an original Netflix series, whilst the previous two series were added to Netflix under the name Top Boy: Summerhouse. A fifth and final series (third series produced by Netflix) was renewed on 31 March 2022 which will air at some point in the future.

The series has received critical acclaim from a small selection of critics for its acting, cinematography, themes, realism, writing, and soundtrack, with favourable comparisons to other black crime shows such as The Wire, Snowfall and Power. It has received several awards and nominations from the British Academy Television Awards, including nominations for the British Academy Television Award for Best Mini-Series and the British Academy Television Award for Best Supporting Actress for Jasmine Jobson as well as wins for the British Academy Television Craft Award for Best Original Music and the British Academy Television Craft Award for Best Scripted Casting.

Plot

Series 1 (2011)
The series follows the plight of Ra'Nell as he navigates the pitfalls of living on the crime-filled Summerhouse estate after his mother, Lisa, is admitted to a mental hospital. Ra'Nell, who has gained a reputation around the estate for his volatile behaviour after stabbing his abusive father, is quiet and closed-off. While his mother is in hospital, he is cared for by her close friend, Leon, who was once a respected enforcer of the estate, but has since put his past behind him. Meanwhile, Lisa's friend Heather enlists Ra'Nell's help to grow a cannabis crop so she can earn enough money to move out of the estate and raise her unborn child somewhere safer.

Meanwhile, his best friend, Gem, finds himself in over his head when he begins to work as a drug dealer for Summerhouse kingpins Dushane and Sully. Gem is easily coerced and finds himself at the mercy of their trusted enforcer, Dris, who is ruthless and violent.

Dushane and Sully run the estate together with relative ease, but when Kamale, a rival drug dealer from London Fields, steals a large amount of their supply, they are forced to hunt down the thief before their supplier, Bobby Raikes, takes action. The urgency of the chase puts Dushane and Sully's partnership in jeopardy.

Series 2 (2013)
The second season was set one year after the events of the first season. After the police uncover a body, Dushane, Sully, and Dris are arrested. Dushane quickly realises that there is a snitch in their crew, and must deal with the repercussions. The snitch is revealed to be Michael, Dushane's favourite dealer, who was forced by the police to give information about Dushane. 

Meanwhile, Sully is attempting to start up his own crew to rival Dushane's with his friend Mike, a borderline-psychopathic ex-convict. When a deal with Dushane's Albanian business partners goes bad, he attempts to enlist Sully's help once more to take them out. He comes into contact with Jason, a neglected boy who is trying to survive in a world filled with drugs and murder. 

Lisa is faced with eviction from her business when the landlord triples her rent, while Ra'Nell tries to better himself by attending football youth trials. Gem is in deep trouble with the vicious Vincent, who uses Gem as his pawn to complete drug deals.

Series 3 (2019)
The third season takes place six years after the second season. Dushane has fled to Jamaica, where he is getting by working in his cousin's car-rental shop. When he makes a business deal with imprisoned drug lord Sugar, he returns to London to sell Sugar's product and become Top Boy once again, with the help of Dris and Jaq, who were running Summerhouse while Dushane was away. However, a new crew from London Fields, headed by the ruthless Jamie, won't stand for Dushane stepping on their turf.

Since Dushane left for Jamaica, London has become more gentrified and cost of living has risen. He also comes home to learn that his sick mother is now under the care of Shelley, a young carer and single mother to an eight-year-old girl, who begins to form a strong relationship with Dushane. 

Sully is in prison with Modie, a murderous drug-dealer who ran the rival London Fields gang in Dushane and Sully's absence. An altercation between the two men when queuing up in the prison cafeteria escalates to the point that Sully throws boiling sugar on Modie's face days before he is due to be released; this serves to make Sully an enemy of Modies who seeks revenge on Sully when later in the season he eventually escapes prison with the help of Sully's cousin Jermaine, whom Sully had kidnapped in the previous season. When Sully is released, he reconnects with Jason and Gem to begin selling in Ramsgate. However, after Jason is killed in a house fire, Sully reluctantly reunites with Dushane and the two start doing business once again. Meanwhile, Dris, having suffered a stroke that has left him partially disabled, struggles with his responsibilities upon Dushane's return.

Jamie attempts to assert his dominance in the borough, driven to provide for his younger brothers, Aaron and Stefan, as their parents both developed cancer and died within days of each other, when Jamie was just 18-years-old. He starts business with an upper-class Irish drug supplier Lizzie and her husband Jeffery and his thirst for power and subsequent battles with Dushane's crew in Summerhouse serve as the main plot throughout this series and culminate in Dushane orchestrating Jamie being sent to prison after police are led to find a bag filled with weapons and drugs in the flat that Jamie lives in with his brothers.

Series 4 (2022)
The fourth season takes place six months after the events of the last season. Dushane wants to expand his empire beyond the streets by making huge investments in London and finding new connects in Spain and Morocco,  which causes tensions between the community and his sick mother, who is now aware and ashamed of her son's business. 

Jamie has been released from prison and his gang begins to work with the Summerhouse gang. He attempts to reconnect with his younger brother, Stefan, following his friend Ats' death to knife crime but is sent by Dushane to sort out a botched drug deal in Spain and Morocco. 

Jaq, Dushane's new second-in-command following the assassination of Dris, tries to rescue her pregnant older sister Lauryn, who is in an abusive relationship with Liverpool-based weapons dealer Curtis.

Sully, suffering PTSD as he comes to terms with murdering Dris and the death of his son-figure and friend Jason, is suspicious about Jamie and Dushane doing business together. Meanwhile, Shelley and other local residents try to fight against Dushane's redevelopments for Summerhouse, whilst Shelley herself comes to terms with her dark past which cause her to be blackmailed for aiding in the burial of her ex-boyfriend's murder victim.

Cast

Cast table
• An empty, grey cell indicates that the character was not in the series, or their presence in the series has not yet been confirmed.

Main
 Ashley Walters as Dushane Hill
 Kane Robinson as Gerard "Sully" Sullivan
 Shone Romulus as Dris Wright (seasons 1–3)
 Malcolm Kamulete as Ra'Nell Smith (seasons 1–2)
 Giacomo Mancini as Gemel “Gem” Mustapha (seasons 1–2; recurring season 3)
 Sharon Duncan-Brewster as Lisa Smith (seasons 1–2)
 Kierston Wareing as Heather (season 1)
 Nicholas Pinnock as Leon (season 1)
 Xavien Russell as Michael (season 2; recurring season 1)
 Micheal Ward as Jamie Tovell (seasons 3–4)
 Jasmine Jobson as Jacqueline “Jaq” Lawrence (season 3–present)
 Simbi Ajikawo as Shelley (season 3–present)
 Hope Ikpoku Jnr. as Aaron Tovell, Jamie's middle brother (season 3–present)
 Araloyin Oshunremi as Stefan Tovell, Jamie's youngest brother (season 3–present)
 Keiyon Cook as Attica "Ats" Ayittey (season 3)
 Jolade Obasola as Amma Ayittey (season 3–4)
 Kadeem Ramsay as Kit, Jamie's best friend (seasons 3–4)
 Lisa Dwan as Lizzie (season 3-present)
 Saffron Hocking as Lauryn Lawrence, Jaq's sister (season 4–present; recurring season 3)

Recurring

 Letitia Wright as Chantelle (season 1)
 Sean Sagar as Tareek (season 1)
 Geoff Bell as Bobby Raikes (season 1)
 David Hayman as Joe (seasons 1–2)
 Benedict Wong as Vincent (seasons 1–2)
 Cyrus Desir as Lee Greene (season 1)
 Tayo Jarrett as Kamale Lewis (season 1)
 Chiefer Appiah as Ninja (seasons 1–2)
 Richie Campbell as Chris Hill, Dushane's estranged brother (season 1, 3–present)
 Marsha Millar as Pat Hill, Dushane's mother (season 1, 3–4)
 Clare-Hope Ashitey as Taylor (season 1, 3)
 Paul Anderson as Mike (season 2)
 Dan Jay Green as Rafe Newton (season 2)
 Ashley Thomas as Jermaine Newton, Sully's estranged cousin (season 2–3)
 Ricky Smarts as Jason, Sully's son figure (seasons 2–3)
 Danielle Flett as Carolyn, Jason's mother (season 2)
 Lorraine Burroughs as Rhianna Parkes, Dushane's lawyer (season 2)
 Nabil Elouahabi as Babrak Mustapha, Gem's father (season 2)
 Michaela Coel as Kayla Thomas (season 2)
 Monique Day as Nevaeh (season 2)
 Weruche Opia as Nafisa (season 2)
 Noah Maxwell Clarke as Shaheed (season 2)
 Kasey McKellar as R-Marni (season 2)
 Andreas Andreou as Collins (season 2)
 David Omoregie as Morris “Modie” Gregory (season 3)
 Seraphina Beh as Farah (season 3–present)
 Kola Bokinni as Leyton (season 3)
 Alessandro Babalola as Haze (season 3)
 Joshua Blissett as Kieron Palmer (season 3–present)
 Isla Jackson Ritchie as Sarah Morrison (season 3–present)
 Josef Altin as Lee (season 3–present)
 Theo Ogundipe as Ruben Miller (season 3-present)
 Elizabeth Tan as Maude (season 3)
 Unique Spencer as Abby, Aaron's girlfriend (season 3)
 Kiko Armstong as Donovan, Dushane's cousin (season 3)
 Shaun Dingwall as Jeffrey, Lizzie's husband (season 3-present)
 Dudley O'Shaughnessy as Si (season 3–present)
 Reniko Francis as Tyrone (season 3–present)
 Nyshai Caynes as Romeo “Romy” Thompson (season 3–present)
 Adwoa Aboah as Becks, Jaq's new love interest (season 4-present)
 NoLay as Mandy, Dris' girlfriend (season 4-present; guest season 2)
 Erin Kellyman as Pebbles, Sully's niece (season 4-present)
 Conya Toccara as Tia, a young rebellious girl who Stefan befriends (season 4-present)
 Howard Charles as Curtis, Lauren's boyfriend (season 4)
 Joséphine de La Baume as Delphine, Sully's love interest (season 4-present)
 Ava Brennan as Vee, Curtis' sister (season 4)
 TerriAnn Oudjar as Beverley, a lady from Shelley's past who returns to blackmail her (season 4)
 Verona Rose as Naomi, Shelley's friend and employee at Shelley's Nails (season 4-present)
 Hugo Silva as Emilio (season 4)
 Mustapha Abourachid as Mounir (season 4)
 Ash Barba as Chaash (season 4)
 Ilani Marriott Lodge as Samsi (season 4)
 Ivan Burdon as Bradders (season 4)
 Íñigo de la Iglesia as Juan el Bueno (season 4)
 Marisa Luisa González Guerrero as Sofia, Emilio's wife (season 4)
 Antonio González Guerrero as Antonio, Sofia's brother (season 4)

Episodes
<onlyinclude>

Series 1 (2011)

Series 2 (2013)

Series 3 (2019)

Series 4 (2022)

Production

Development
Top Boy was written and created by Belfast born novelist Ronan Bennett, who also produced the series through his production company Eastern Partisan. Bennett inspired to write the series after he saw a twelve-year-old boy dealing drugs at his local Tesco supermarket in Hackney. Bennett, assisted by his friend Gerry Jackson, interviewed several drug dealers in the area about their lifestyle in order to depict a sense of realism. Jackson was later credited as a story consultant on the series.

The series pilot was originally commissioned by the BBC but the head of drama was too critical about the strong violence and profainty in the script. Eventually, Bennett met with producers Charles Steel and Alasdair Flind of Cowboy Films and in July 2010, it was announced that the series had been commissioned by Channel 4 as a four-part drama.

Casting

The series cast UK rappers, along with seasoned and newcoming talent. So Solid Crew rapper turned actor Ashley Walters and British rapper Kane Robinson were cast as lead characters Dushane and Sully respectively. Following his breakthrough performance in the 2004 film Bullet Boy, Walters turned down several roles in urban films and TV shows but he chose to audition for Top Boy because of its realistic characterization. 

Robinson, a rapper from London known as Kano, was cast as Sully, in his acting debut. The character of Sully was written as an Asian drug dealer but casting director Des Hamilton, director Yann Demange and Bennett were all impressed with Robinson's chemistry test with Walters, and re-wrote the character for Robinson.

Walters and Robinson led the series alongside other rappers including Scorcher as London Fields gang leader Kamale. UK rappers Giggs and Sway make cameo appearances in the first season. The first season also featured Shone Romolus as Dris, Dushane and Sully's trusted enforcer, newcomers Malcolm Kamulete and Giacomo Mancini as best friends Ra'Nell and Gem, Sharon Duncan-Brewster as Ra'Nell's mum Lisa, Nicholas Pinnock as Leon, Lisa's friend and a father figure to Ra'Nell, Kierston Wareing, Lisa's pregnant friend Heather, Benedict Wong as cannabis dealer Vincent and Geoff Bell as drug lord Bobby Raikes. The series also featured a then-eighteen-year-old Letitia Wright as Chantelle, a member of the Summerhouse gang and Gem's love interest.

The second season was the reprisals of Walters, Robinson, Romolus, Kamulete, Mancini, Duncan-Brewster and Wong with new additions including rapper Bashy as Jermaine, Sully's cousin, Lorraine Burroughs as Rhianna Parkes, Dushane's lawyer, Paul Anderson as Mike, Sully's new business partner, Nabil Elouahabi as Babrak Mustapha, Gem's father, Ricky Smarts as Jason, Sully's friend and son figure and Michaela Coel as Kayla Thomas, a woman who was in contact with Kamale.

In April 2019, following the series' revival by Netflix, it was announced that Micheal Ward would join the cast as the new London Fields leader Jamie. He previously auditioned to play Jamie's younger brother Aaron. Rappers Dave and Little Simz were cast as Modie and Shelly, respectively. New additions to the third and fourth seasons include Jasmine Jobson, Hope Ikpoku Jr., Araloyin Oshunremi, Keiyon Cook, Jolade Obasola, Kadeem Ramsay, Lisa Dwan, Joshua Blisset, Saffron Hocking and Adwoa Aboah.

Filming locations
The Heygate Estate and Loughborough Estate, both in South London, were used as the Summerhouse estate during the first two seasons. Production visited several locations in Kent for the third season. Filming took place in Margate at Walpole Bay and Fulsam Rock Beach and nearby streets including Athelstan Road. Production also visited Ramsgate, where they filmed at Jacob's Ladder, outside the Rose of England pub on the High Street and Ramsgate Station. Gordon Place in Gravesend doubles as the fictional Summerhouse estate throughout the season.

For the third and fourth seasons, the Samuda Estate on the Isle of Dogs and the De Beauvoir Estate in the London Borough of Hackney double as the Summerhouse estate. The Dockside Outlet Shopping Centre in Chatham, Kent features in Series 4 Episode 5, doubling as a shopping mall in Liverpool.

With the series being set in Hackney much of the filming took place in the borough in areas including Dalston, Haggerston and London Fields. Legal scenes in season 4 were filmed in the old Blackfriars Crown Court.

Music

The original score for the series was composed by Brian Eno and Michael Asante. In addition to its original music, Top Boy features grime, hip-hop and R&B from artists including Ghostpoet, AJ Tracey, Giggs, Central Cee, Roots Manuva and Burna Boy. 

On 13 September 2019, an original soundtrack for the series, titled Top Boy (A Selection of Music Inspired by the Series), was released by OVO Sound and Warner to accommodate with the release of the third season. The soundtrack includes appearances from OVO's Drake, Baka Not Nice, and Popcaan and British artists AJ Tracey, Avelino, Dave, Fredo, Ghetts, Headie One, Little Simz, M Huncho, Nafe Smallz, Central Cee and SL.

Cancellation and revival series
Despite its successful ratings and critical acclaim, in 2014, it was announced by Walters that Channel 4 had cancelled the series after two seasons. Speaking in 2019, Bennett expressed his disappointment about the abrupt cancellation, feeling that Channel 4 cancelling the series was a "smack in the face to the community".

Around the time of the show's cancellation, Canadian rapper Drake became a fan of the series after watching it in parts on YouTube and posted screenshots of the series on his social media. After learning that a third season was cancelled, Drake met up with the series' producers and Walters about reviving the series. Drake brought the rights to the series and pitched it to Netflix, who greenlit the third season in November 2017, with Drake serving as executive producer and most of the original cast and crew reprising their roles. The third season was filmed from July 2018 to February 2019, and was released on 13 September 2019, the first season on Netflix, consisting of ten episodes.

In January 2020, the series was renewed for a second season on Netflix (fourth season overall), with filming set to start in the spring of that year. However, due to COVID-19, filming was delayed and started in late November/early December. The season was released on Netflix on 18 March 2022, consisting of eight episodes. 

In March 2022, shortly after the debut of the fourth season, it was announced that the series was renewed for a third season on Netflix (fifth season overall), which was announced as the final season of the series. Filming began in July 2022.

Reception

Critical reception and viewership
Top Boy received positive feedback from critics. The first two seasons premiered with 1 million viewers, and managed to maintain its audience share over the course of its two-year run. Tom Sutcliffe, writing in The Independent, said: "The drama involved virtually no preaching at all, but a sense of morality was everywhere, as bad conscience flickered in the face of the toughest characters and grief hit the culpable and the blameless alike. Best of all, it always found a little time for something other than plot, whether it was banter on stairwells or the melancholy beauty of the city at night. Seriously good television."

The revival series was met with greater acclaim for its performances, emotional depth, soundtrack, writing and bigger scope and scale, with critics considering it as the best season of the series. Rebecca Nicholson, writing in The Guardian, described the third season as "more violent, more gripping and more shocking than ever". Ellen E Jones, also of The Guardian, praised the fourth season, writing that the series "always leaves you guessing".

References

External links
 
 
 

2011 British television series debuts
2010s British crime drama television series
2020s British crime drama television series
2010s British teen television series
2020s British teen television series
2010s teen drama television series
2020s teen drama television series
Black British television shows
British teen drama television series
British television series revived after cancellation
Channel 4 original programming
Channel 4 crime television shows
English-language Netflix original programming
Television productions suspended due to the COVID-19 pandemic
Television series about teenagers
Television shows shot in Kent
Television shows set in London
Youth culture in the United Kingdom